Ruppia cirrhosa is a species of aquatic plant known by the common names spiral ditchgrass and spiral tasselweed. It is native to the Americas and Europe, where it grows in freshwater bodies, such as lakes. It is a thread-thin, grasslike perennial herb which grows from a rhizome anchored in the wet substrate. It produces a long, narrow inflorescence tipped with two tiny flowers. As the fruit develops the peduncle of the inflorescence curls into a neat spiral.

Taxonomy and nomenclature
A lectotype for this name is designated and the name is shown to be a homotypic synonym of R. maritima. Consequently, R. spiralis has nomenclatural priority over R. cirrhosa for the long- and coiled-pedunculate Ruppia.

References

External links
The IUCN Red List
Jepson Manual Treatment
Flora of North America

cirrhosa